Economic miracle is an informal economic term for a period of dramatic economic development that is entirely unexpected or unexpectedly strong. Economic miracles have occurred in the recent histories of a number of countries, often those undergoing an economic boom, or described as a tiger economy.

Post-World War II
See Post–World War II economic expansion.
Four Asian Tigers (South Korea, Taiwan, Hong Kong, and Singapore, c. 1960s–1990s)
Miracle on the Han River (South Korea, c. 1962–1997)
Taiwan Miracle (1961–2000)
Swiss miracle (c. 1940s-2000s)
Japanese economic miracle (c. 1945–1990)
Trente Glorieuses (France, c. 1945–1975)
Record years (Sweden, c. 1947–1974)
Wirtschaftswunder (West Germany and Austria, c. 1950s–1970s)
Mexican miracle (c. 1940s–1970s) (term not used by economists)
Belgian economic miracle (1945–1948)
Greek economic miracle (1950–1973)
Italian economic miracle (c. 1950–1973)
Spanish miracle (1959–1974)

Later
Tiger Cub Economies (Indonesia, Malaysia, Thailand, the Philippines and Vietnam, c. 2010s-present)
Indonesian economic boom (1976–present)
Malaysian miracle (1971–present)
Philippine economic boom (1986–present)
Thai economic boom (1980s–present)
Đổi Mới (Vietnam, 1986–present)
Brazilian Miracle (1968–1973)
Miracle of Chile (c. 1970s–2020)
Chinese economic boom (1978–present)
Indian economic boom (1991-present)
Massachusetts Miracle (1980s)
Gulf Tiger (Dubai city, c. 1990s–2008)
Celtic Tiger (Ireland, c. 1995–2007)
Baltic Tigers (Estonia, Latvia, or Lithuania, c. 2000–2007)
Tatra Tiger (Slovakia, 2002–2007)
Turkish economic boom in 2000s (Turkey, c. 2000–2018)
Adriatic Tiger (Slovenia, 2004-2009)
Carpat Tiger (Romania, 1991-2009)

References

Further reading
 Broken link